William Findlay (born 29 August 1970) is a Scottish former association footballer who played as a midfielder. Findlay began his senior career with Hibernian, making just over 100 appearances for the Easter Road side before moving back to hometown club Kilmarnock in the mid-1990s. From there, Findlay spent a year with Ayrshire rivals Ayr United before a short spell with Queen of the South.

After leaving senior football, Findlay played for Maybole up until the mid-2000s.

Findlay is now active on the darts scene and indeed is deadly on the double 10.

References

External links
 

1970 births
Footballers from Kilmarnock
Living people
Association football midfielders
Scottish footballers
Hibernian F.C. players
Kilmarnock F.C. players
Ayr United F.C. players
Queen of the South F.C. players
Scottish Football League players
Scottish Junior Football Association players
Scotland under-21 international footballers
Maybole F.C. players
Sligo Rovers F.C. players
League of Ireland players
Expatriate association footballers in the Republic of Ireland